SS William Few was a Liberty ship built in the United States during World War II. She was named after William Few, an American politician, farmer, businessman, and a Founding Father of the United States. Few represented the US state of Georgia at the Constitutional Convention and signed the United States Constitution. Few, along with James Gunn, were the first Senators from Georgia.

Construction
William Few was laid down on 14 July 1942, under a Maritime Commission (MARCOM) contract, MCE hull 309, by the Bethlehem-Fairfield Shipyard, Baltimore, Maryland; she was sponsored by Mrs. Frank Egan, the daughter J. Kirkpatrick, the chief hull inspector for MARCOM, in Philadelphia, and was launched on 28 August 1942.

History
She was allocated to Merchant & Miners Transportation Co., on 10 September 1942. On 30 December 1946, she was sold for commercial use to Compañia Navegacion de Vapores, for $544,506. She was scrapped in Osaka, in 1969.

References

Bibliography

 
 
 
 

 

Liberty ships
Ships built in Baltimore
1942 ships
Ships named for Founding Fathers of the United States